The Rhondda Valleys were, between 1860 and 1939, one of the world's most important coal mining regions. The list below attempts to show a complete list of levels and collieries opened within the Rhondda. A level is seen as a horizontal cut into a hill or mountain to access a seam of coal, while a colliery consists of shafts mined into the earth to reach seams of coal underground.

List entries
Colliery states the name the colliery or level was known as when it first opened; many sites were enlarged, and some levels were developed into collieries. If a site was expanded from a level to a colliery, or significant additional shafts were added, the column Formerly draws attention to the original site name.  

The Date opened records the first attempt to open a level or pit at the site, though often the level or colliery was abandoned without production due to problems; which including flooding, financing or failure to reach a seam. The Original owner category lists the person or organisation that first attempted to open the mine, though again they may not have been the first person or group to successfully extract coal from the site. The Closed date is the year where the colliery or level stopped extracting coal, though many mines were kept open as ventilation or pumping shafts after they became economically nonviable. 

Men employed returns the numbers of workers at each mine at the colliery's peak. This does not reflect the tonnage of coal extracted, just the numbers of men working. Many dates reoccur as these are the years when the Inspector of Mines took official head counts.

References

Bibliography

External links
 Welsh Coal Mines

 List of collieries
 List of coal mines